The following lists the number one singles on the Australian Singles Chart during the 1970s. The source for this decade is the "Kent Music Report".

1970

Other hits
Songs peaking at number two included "Fortunate Son" / "Down on the Corner" by Creedence Clearwater Revival, "Smiley" by Ronnie Burns, "I Thank You" by Lionel Rose, "Love Grows (Where My Rosemary Goes)" by Edison Lighthouse, "Bridge Over Troubled Water" by Simon and Garfunkel, "Knock, Knock Who's There?" by Liv Maessen, "Lay Down (Candles in the Rain)" by Melanie, "Spill the Wine" by Eric Burdon & War, "Cracklin' Rosie" by Neil Diamond, and "It's Only Make Believe" by Glen Campbell.

Other hits (with their peak positions noted) were "Holly Holy" by Neil Diamond (3), "Don't Cry Daddy" / "Rubberneckin'" by Elvis Presley (3), "Ma Belle Amie" by Tee-Set (3), "All I Have to Do Is Dream" by Bobbie Gentry and Glen Campbell (3), "Tennessee Bird Walk" by Jack Blanchard & Misty Morgan (3), "The Wonder of You" by Elvis Presley (3), "What Have They Done to My Song Ma?" by The New Seekers (3), "Airport Love Theme" by Vincent Bell (4), "Old Man Emu" by John Williamson (4), "Knock, Knock Who's There?" by Mary Hopkin (5).

Hits by Australasian artists included "Two Little Boys" by Rolf Harris, "A Little Ray of Sunshine" by Axiom, "Snowbird" by Liv Maessen and "Comic Conservation" by Johnny Farnham.

1971

Other hits
Songs peaking at number two included "Chirpy Chirpy Cheep Cheep" by Middle of the Road, "Symphony No. 40 (Mozart)" by Waldo de los Ríos, "I Don't Know How to Love Him" by Helen Reddy, "L.A. International Airport" by Susan Raye, and "Love is A Beautiful Song" by Dave Mills.

Other hits (with their peak positions noted) were "What is Life" / "Apple Scruffs" by George Harrison (3), "It Don't Come Easy" by Ringo Starr (3), "How Can You Mend a Broken Heart" by Bee Gees (3), "I Did What I Did for Maria" by Tony Christie (3), "Mamy Blue" by Joël Daydé (3), "Lola" by The Kinks (4), "I Hear You Knocking" by Dave Edmunds (4), "Brown Sugar" by The Rolling Stones (5), and "It's Too Late" / "I Feel the Earth Move" by Carole King (6).

Hits by Australasian artists included "Eleanor Rigby" by Zoot, "Come Back Again" by Daddy Cool, "Sweet, Sweet Love" by Russell Morris, "Speak to the Sky" by Rick Springfield, "Falling in Love Again" by Ted Mulry, and "Seasons of Change" by Blackfeather.

1972

Other hits
Songs peaking at number two included "Day by Day" by Colleen Hewett, "The Ranger Waltz" by The Mom and Dads, "Most People That I Know" by Billy Thorpe and the Aztecs, "A Horse with No Name" by America, "Alone Again (Naturally)" by Gilbert O'Sullivan, "Long Haired Lover From Liverpool" by Little Jimmy Osmond, "Long Cool Woman in a Black Dress" by The Hollies, "Baby Don't Get Hooked on Me" by Mac Davis, and "You're a Lady" by Peter Skellern.

Other hits (with their peak positions noted) were "My World" / "On Time" by Bee Gees (3), "Joy" by Apollo 100 (3), "Vincent" / "Castles in the Air" by Don McLean (3), "The Candy Man" by Sammy Davis Jr. (3), "Run to Me" by Bee Gees (3), "Breaking Up Is Hard to Do" by The Partridge Family (3), "Burning Love" by Elvis Presley (3), "Morning Has Broken" by Cat Stevens (4), "Hurting Each Other" by The Carpenters (4), "Gypsys, Tramps & Thieves" by Cher (5), "Uncle Albert/Admiral Halsey" by Paul and Linda McCartney (5), and "The Redback on the Toilet Seat" by Slim Newton (5).

Hits by Australasian artists included "Pasadena" by John Paul Young, "Captain Zero" by The Mixtures, "So Tough" by Johnny O'Keefe, "Live with Friends" by Russell Morris, and "Superman" / "Take Me Back" by Alison McCallum.

1973

Other hits
Songs peaking at number two included "I Am Woman" by Helen Reddy, "Crocodile Rock" by Elton John, "Funny Face" by Donna Fargo, "Last Song" by Edward Bear, "Part of the Union" by Strawbs, "The Twelfth of Never" by Donny Osmond, "And I Love You So" by Perry Como, "Say, Has Anybody Seen My Sweet Gypsy Rose" by Tony Orlando and Dawn, "Dancin' (on a Saturday Night)" by Barry Blue, "I Am Pegasus" by Ross Ryan, and "The Ballroom Blitz" by Sweet.

Other hits (with their peak positions noted) were "The Happiest Girl in the Whole U.S.A." by Donna Fargo (3), "I Can See Clearly Now" by Johnny Nash (3), "Dueling Banjos" by Eric Weissberg (3), "I Don't Wanna Play House" by Barbara Ray (3), "Rubber Bullets" by 10cc (3), "Monster Mash" by Bobby Pickett (3), "Dreams are a Ten Penny" by Kincade (4), "Don't Expect Me to Be Your Friend" by Lobo (4), "Half-Breed" by Cher (4), "Mouldy Old Dough" by Lieutenant Pigeon (5), and "Daniel" by Elton John (7).

Hits by Australasian artists included "Cassandra" by Sherbet, "Let Me Be There" by Olivia Newton-John, and "Everything is Out of Season" by Johnny Farnham

1974

Other hits
Songs peaking at number two included "She (Didn't Remember My Name)" by Osmosis, "The Air That I Breathe" by The Hollies, "The Entertainer" by Marvin Hamlisch, "The Streak" by Ray Stevens, "Would You Lay with Me (In a Field of Stone)" by Judy Stone, "Sugar Baby Love" by The Rubettes, "Rock Your Baby" by George McCrae, "Can't Stop Myself From Loving You" by William Shakespeare, "(You're) Having My Baby" by Paul Anka, and "Hey Paula" by Ernie Sigley and Denise Drysdale.

Other hits (with their peak positions noted) were "The Lord's Prayer" by Sister Janet Mead (3), "You Make Me Feel Brand New" by The Stylistics (3), "Goodbye Yellow Brick Road" by Elton John (4), "I Love You Love Me Love" by Gary Glitter (4), "Hooked on a Feeling" by Blue Swede (4), "Daytona Demon" by Suzi Quatro (4), "Waterloo" by ABBA (4), "Sundown" by Gordon Lightfoot (4), "Candle in the Wind" / "Bennie and the Jets" by Elton John (5), "Annie's Song" by John Denver (5), and "You're Sixteen" by Ringo Starr (6), and "The Way We Were" by Barbra Streisand (7).

Hits by Australasian artists included "Slipstream" and "Silvery Moon" by Sherbet, "Good Morning (How Are You?)/We Will Never Change" by The Moir Sisters, "Mama's Little Girl" by Linda George, and "Long Live Love" by Olivia Newton-John

1975

Other hits
Songs peaking at number two included "The Wild One" by Suzi Quatro, "When Will I See You Again" by The Three Degrees, "Santa Never Made It into Darwin" by Bill and Boyd, "Blue Angel" by Gene Pitney, "If You Love Me (Let Me Know)" by Olivia Newton-John, "Ego Is Not a Dirty Word" and "All My Friends Are Getting Married" by Skyhooks, "Give a Little Love" by Bay City Rollers, "Paloma Blanca" by George Baker Selection and "Sailing" by Rod Stewart.

Other hits (with their peak positions noted) were "Gee Baby" by Peter Shelley (3), "Lucy in the Sky with Diamonds" by Elton John" (3), "Never Can Say Goodbye" by Gloria Gaynor (3), "My Eyes Adored You" by Frankie Valli (3), "Roll Over Lay Down" by Status Quo (3), "The Last Farewell" by Roger Whittaker (3), "I'm Not in Love" by 10cc (3), "Sky High" by British Jigsaw (3), "You Ain't Seen Nothing Yet" by Bachman-Turner Overdrive (4), "Girls on the Avenue" by Richard Clapton (4), "Gonna Make You a Star" by David Essex (4), "Mandy' by Barry Manilow (4), "Philadelphia Freedom" by The Elton John Band (4), "The Love Game" by John Paul Young (4), "Rhinestone Cowboy" by Glen Campbell (5), and "Million Dollar Riff" by Skyhooks (6).

Hits by Australasian artists included "Matter of Time" / "Only One You" by Sherbet, "Sparrow Song" by The Seekers, "Have You Never been Mellow" by Olivia Newton-John, and "High Voltage" by AC/DC.

1976

Other hits
Songs peaking at number two included "Hold Me Close" by David Essex, "Slipping Away" by Max Merritt & The Meteors, "December, 1963 (Oh, What a Night)" by The Four Seasons, "I Hate the Music" by John Paul Young, and "Mississippi" by Pussycat.

Other hits (with their peak positions noted) were "Money Honey" by Bay City Rollers (3), "Darktown Strutters' Ball" by Ted Mulry Gang (3), "Moviestar" by Harpo (3), "Love Really Hurts Without You" by Billy Ocean (3), "We Do It" by R&J Stone (3), "Devil Woman" by Cliff Richard (3), "Tonight's the Night (Gonna Be Alright)" by Rod Stewart (3), "Jeans On" by David Dundas (3), "Right Back Where We Started From" by Maxine Nightingale (4), "Love to Love You Baby" by Donna Summer (4), "You Sexy Thing" by Hot Chocolate (4), "A Glass of Champagne" by Sailor (4), "City Lights" by David Essex (4), "Rock Me" by ABBA (4), "Kiss and Say Goodbye" by The Manhattans (4), "Disco Duck" by Rick Dees & His Cast of Idiots (4), "That's the Way (I Like It)" by KC & The Sunshine Band (5), "Save Your Kisses for Me" by Brotherhood of Man (5), "I Write the Songs" by Barry Manilow (5), "Let Your Love Flow" by Bellamy Brothers (6), and "All By Myself" by Eric Carmen (7).

Hits by Australasian artists included "Child's Play" and "Matter of Time"/"Only One You" by Sherbet, "Old Sid" by Daryl Braithwaite, "It's a Long Way to the Top (If You Wanna Rock 'n' Roll)" by AC/DC, "Blue Jeans" by Skyhooks, "Crazy" by Ted Mulry Gang, and "Keep On Smilin'" by John Paul Young.

1977

Other hits
Songs peaking at number two included "Every Little Bit Hurts" by Shirley, "You Make Me Feel Like Dancing" by Leo Sayer, "Livin' Thing" by Electric Light Orchestra, "That's Rock 'n' Roll" by Shaun Cassidy, "Living Next Door To Alice" by Smokie, "You and Me" by Alice Cooper, "Magazine Madonna" by Sherbet, "Lido Shuffle" / "What Can I Say" by Boz Scaggs, "Ain't Gonna Bump No More (With No Big Fat Woman)" by Joe Tex,  "Don't Fall in Love" by The Ferrets, "In the Flesh" by Blondie, and "You" by Marcia Hines.

Other hits (with their peak positions noted) were "The Best Disco in Town" by The Ritchie Family (3), "You've Gotta Get Up and Dance" by Supercharge (3), "It's All Over Now, Baby Blue" by Graham Bonnet (3), "Star Wars Theme/Cantina Band" by Meco (3), "Dance Little Lady Dance" by Tina Charles (4), "Rio" by Michael Nesmith (4), "Daddy Cool" by Boney M. (5), "Stand Tall" by Burton Cummings (5), "Ma Baker" by Boney M. (5), "The Things We Do For Love " by 10cc (5), "Evergreen (Love Theme from A Star Is Born)" by Barbra Streisand (5), "Love Has No Pride" / "Fly Away" by Daryl Braithwaite (5), "Fanfare for the Common Man" by Emerson, Lake & Palmer (5), "Don't Leave Me This Way" by Thelma Houston (6), "Magic Man" by Heart (6), "This Is Tomorrow" by Bryan Ferry (6), "Rich Girl" by Daryl Hall & John Oates (6), and " Lucille" by Kenny Rogers (7).

Hits by Australasian artists included "Rock Me Gently" by Sherbet, "Get That Jive" by Dragon,  "I Wanna Do It with You" by John Paul Young, "My Little Girl" by Ted Mulry Gang, and "What I Did For Love" by Marcia Hines.

1978

Other hits
Songs peaking at number two included "April Sun in Cuba" by Dragon, "Surfin' U.S.A." and "I Was Made for Dancin'" by Leif Garrett, "Emotion" by Samantha Sang, "Ebony Eyes" by Bob Welch, "Warm Ride" by Graham Bonnet, "Grease" by Frankie Valli, "Hopelessly Devoted to You" by Olivia Newton-John, "Dreadlock Holiday" by 10cc, and "You Needed Me" by Anne Murray.

Other hits (with their peak positions noted) were " How Deep Is You Love" by Bee Gees (3), "Blue Bayou" by Linda Ronstadt (3), "If I Had Words" by Scott Fitzgerald & Yvonne Keeley (3), "You Took the Words Right Out of My Mouth" by Meat Loaf (3), "Sometimes When We Touch" by Dan Hill (3), "Can't Smile Without You" by Barry Manilow (3), "Love Is In The Air" by John Paul Young (3), "Macho Man" by Village People (3), "Dancing In The City" by Marshall Hain (3), "Jack and Jill" by Raydio (4), "Down Among the Dead Men" by "Flash and the Pan" (4), "I Need a Lover" by Johnny Cougar (5), "The Name of the Game" by ABBA (6), "Summer Nights" by John Travolta and Olivia Newton-John (6), "Sultans of Swing" by Dire Straits (6), "You Light Up My Life" by Debby Boone (7), and "Night Fever" by Bee Gees (7).

Hits by Australasian artists included "Women in Uniform" by Skyhooks, "Standing in the Rain" by John Paul Young, "Another Night on the Road" by Sherbet, and "Walking in the Rain" by Cheetah.

1979

Other hits
Songs peaking at number two included "Ça plane pour moi" by Plastic Bertrand, "Stumblin' In" by Suzi Quatro and Chris Norman, "Tragedy" by Bee Gees, "Hit Me with Your Rhythm Stick" by Ian Dury and The Blockheads, "Baby It's You" by Promises, "Knock on Wood" by Amii Stewart, "Lucky Number" by Lene Lovich, "Bright Eyes" by Art Garfunkel, "I Was Made for Lovin' You" by KISS and "Goosebumps" by Christie Allen.

Other hits (with their peak positions noted) were "Ring My Bell" by Anita Ward (3), "Hot Summer Nights" by Night (3), "We Don't Talk Anymore" by Cliff Richard (3), "Tusk" by Fleetwood Mac (3), and "Babe" by Styx (3), "Chiquitita" by ABBA (4), "On the Inside" by Lynne Hamilton, "Get Used to It" by Roger Voudouris (4), "Too Much Heaven" by Bee Gees (5), "I Will Survive" by Gloria Gaynor (5), "Cool for Cats" by Squeeze (5), "Gold" by John Stewart (5), "My Life" by Billy Joel (6), "Every Time I Think of You" by The Babys (6), "Goodnight Tonight" by Wings (6), "Boogie Wonderland" by Earth, Wind & Fire (6), "Don't Bring Me Down" by Electric Light Orchestra (6), "Fire" by The Pointer Sisters (7), and "In the Navy" by Village People (7).

Hits by Australasian artists included "Six Ribbons" by Jon English, "I'm Coming Home" by Birtles & Goble, "Dream Lover" by Glenn Shorrock, "Something's Missing (In My Life)" by Marcia Hines, "I See Red" by Split Enz, and "The Nips Are Getting Bigger" by Mental as Anything.

See also
Music of Australia
Lists of UK Singles Chart number ones
List of UK Singles Chart number ones of the 1970s
List of Billboard number-one singles

References

David Kent's Australian Chart Book: based on the Kent Music Report
Australian Record Industry Association (ARIA) official site

1970s
Number-one singles
Australia Singles